Vladimir Shayslamov (born July 23, 1970) is an Uzbekistani sprint canoer who competed in the mid-1990s. At the 1996 Summer Olympics in Atlanta, he was eliminated in the repechages of the C-2 500 m event and the semifinals of the C-2 1000 m event.

External links
Sports-Reference.com profile

1970 births
Canoeists at the 1996 Summer Olympics
Living people
Olympic canoeists of Uzbekistan
Uzbekistani male canoeists
Canoeists at the 1998 Asian Games
Asian Games competitors for Uzbekistan
20th-century Uzbekistani people